Antonio Emanuele Ne Vunda (died 1608), also Antonio Manuel Nsaku Nvunda (or Vunta or Funda) was an ambassador from the Central African Kingdom of Kongo to the Vatican, sent by the king of Kongo Alvaro II to Pope Paul V in 1604–1608. Ne Vunda traveled through Brazil and Spain and only reached Rome on 3 January 1608, but he died two days later of illness.

Emanuele (in Portuguese, Manuel) Ne Vunda is nowadays considered to have been the first African ambassador to Europe in history.

A 1608–1609 bust of Ne-Vunda made in colored marble can be seen at Santa Maria Maggiore, by Francesco Caporale.

A painting of Emanuele Ne Vunda is visible in the Sala dei Corazzieri, Palazzo del Quirinale in Rome, next to a painting depicting the 1615 embassy of Hasekura Tsunenaga from Japan.

References

Bibliography 
 Teobaldo Filesi, Le relazioni tra il Regno del Congo e la Sede Apostolica nel XVI secolo, Pietro Cairoli, Como 1968.
 Luis Martínez Ferrer, Marco Nocca (ed.), “Coisas do outro mundo” A Missão em Roma de António Manuel, Príncipe de N’Funta, conhecido per “o Negrita” (1604-1608), na Roma de Paulo V, Urbaniana University Press, Città del Vaticano, 2003.

Kingdom of Kongo
1608 deaths
Year of birth unknown
Ambassadors to the Holy See
16th-century births